Tennessee's 19th Senate district is one of 33 districts in the Tennessee Senate. It has been represented by Democrat Brenda Gilmore since 2018, succeeding fellow Democrat Thelma Harper.

Geography
District 19 is based in downtown Nashville, covering some or all of North Nashville, Antioch, East Nashville, Madison, and Goodlettsville. The district, located in Davidson County, is the only majority-Black Senate district in the state outside of Memphis.

The district is located entirely within Tennessee's 5th congressional district, and overlaps with the 50th, 51st, 52nd, 54th, 55th, 58th, and 59th districts of the Tennessee House of Representatives.

Recent election results
Tennessee Senators are elected to staggered four-year terms, with odd-numbered districts holding elections in midterm years and even-numbered districts holding elections in presidential years.

2018

2014

Federal and statewide results in District 19

References 

19
Davidson County, Tennessee